Donetsk National Technical University (DonNTU, formerly Donetsk Polytechnic Institute and other names) is the biggest and oldest higher education establishment in Donbas, founded in 1921. In its early years, it was attended by Nikita Khrushchev.

Following the loss of Ukrainian government control over Donetsk in 2014 during the war in Donbass, the University was evacuated to Pokrovsk. 

A small group of collaborationists among the faculty have claimed to continue to operate as the Donetsk National Technical University in the campus in Russian-occupied Donetsk, as a project aimed to legitimize the so-called Donetsk People's Republic, however diplomas they issued weren't recognized even in Russia itself and local students were officially enrolled as correspondent students at minor provincial russian universities. Following a full scale russian invasion of Ukraine since the beginning of 2022 the fake university appears to have been discontinued.

Structure
Donetsk National Technical University (DonNTU) is the first higher education establishment in the Donbas Region and one of the first technical universities in Ukraine. 27,000 students study at 7 faculties,  60 specialities being their major. There are 28 correspondent members and academicians of the engineering academies, 18 honorary researchers and professors among the academics of the university. A number of scientists of DonNTU are honorary and full members of foreign organizations and academies. There are professors and students whose work was supported by the Soros Fund.

Collaboration
 DonNTU has more than 70 collaboration agreements with universities all over the world. 
 There is an office of the Siemens company at the university. 
 At the three engineering faculties (German, French, and English) students are trained in the appropriate foreign language. 
 A Polish faculty has been established. 
 Thirty professors from foreign universities are Honorary Doctors of DonNTU. 
 The university has a reading room sponsored by the Goethe Institute, Germany.

Donetsk National Technical University is a member of the EAU (European Association of Universities).

DonNTU is a member of
 UICEE – The International Engineering Education Centre sponsored by UNESCO, Melbourne, Australia
 EAIE – European Association of International Education
 EAAU – Euro-Asian Association of Universities
 SEFI – European Association of Engineering Education
 IGIP – International Association of Engineering Education (Austria) 
 COFRAMA – French Council on Management links development with the countries of the CIS and Russia (Lion, France); PRELUDE – International Association of Research and links with universities (Belgium)
 CEUME – Consortium of Management Education in Ukraine (the US, Poland)
 URAN – Ukrainian Educational and Research Network sponsored by the NATO and German Research Network

DonNTU is a participant in the following international programmes: 
 TEMPUS-TACIS NCD-JEP – 23125-2002 European Studios; DAAD  Eastern Partnerships (Germany)
 Stipend of the International Board of the Ministry of Education  and Science (the German Aerodynamics Center)  
 BWTZ-Programm (Germany, the Ministry of Science)
 INTAS – Publishing House (Germany)
 BMEU/CEUME   Business - Management - Education (USA, Poland)
 The Jozef Mihknowski Science Development Fund (Poland)
 Students Exchange Programmes AIESEC (Poland)
 Grant from the Ministry of Education and Sports, Poland
 Grant from the Ministry of Education and Science (Russia)
 Programme Dnipro (France)
 Grant of the Special School of Social Works, Construction and Industry (ESTP), (France)
 Grant from the government of Czech Republic
 SIDA – Master and Bachelor programme Sandwich (Sweden)

Gallery

References

External links

 Official website of the University
 Website of russian collaborationsts, offline since February 2022 

 
Universities and colleges in Donetsk
Educational institutions established in 1921
1921 establishments in Ukraine
Technical universities and colleges in Ukraine
National universities in Ukraine
Institutions with the title of National in Ukraine